The 2015 Team Speedway Junior World Championship was the 11th FIM Team Under-21 World Championship season. The final took place on 31 October, 2015 at the Olympic Park Speedway in Mildura, Australia, the first time it was held outside of Europe.

Poland won their 8th Team Under-21 World Championship. The Poles dominated the Final, winning 15 of the 20 heats.

Results 
In the 2015 Final the host team was Australia. The other three finalists were determined in two Semi-Finals held on 22 August. First and second places from Semi-final 1 held in Güstrow, Germany would go through to the final. The winner of Semi-final 2 held on the same day in Opole, Poland would earn the last place in the Final.

Denmark won the first Semi-final from the host nation Germany, Great Britain and Finland. Defending Under-21 World Champions Poland were easy winners of the second Semi-final from the Czech Republic, Russia and Sweden.

Heat details

Final 

 31 October 2015
  Mildura, Olympic Park Speedway
 Referee:  Jesper Steentoft

^ donates Joker

See also 
 2015 Speedway World Cup
 2015 Individual Speedway Junior World Championship

References 

2015
World Team Junior